Zayn al-Dīn al-Juba'ī al'Amilī (1506-1559), also known as ash-Shahīd ath-Thanī ("The Second Martyr") was a Twelver Shia Muslim scholar.

Early life 
He was born Zayn al-Dīn bin Nur al-Dīn 'Alī bin Aḥmad bin Muḥammad bin 'Alī bin Jamal al-Dīn bin Taqī bin Sāliḥ bin Mushrif al-'Amilī al-Shamī al-Ṭalluṣī al-Juba'ī, in the village of Jbaa, on the 13th of Shawwal, 911 AH (1506 CE). His father, Sheikh Nur al-Din 'Ali was also a scholar. 

His ancestor, Sāliḥ, was a student of Allamah al-Hilli.

Career and Travels 
Thani studied under both Sunni and Shi'a scholars in Jabal 'Amel, Damascus, Cairo, Jerusalem.

In 1536, he moved to Egypt, where he learned Usul al-Fiqh, geometry, prosody, medicine and logic.

In 1543, he traveled to Constantinople and met with Muhammad bin Muhammad bin Qāḍī Zāda al-Rūmī, with whom he shared multiple treatises relating to several subjects, including mathematics, astronomy and religion. The latter offered him the highest teaching position in a school of his choice, which was eventually the Nuriyya School of Baalbek.

Death 

In Rajab of 965 A.H. (1558), he was beheaded on his way to see the sultan and a shrine was built by some Turkmens on the site.

Legacy 
His Magnum opus is the first commentary of The Damascene Glitter by Shahid Awwal called The Beautiful Garden in Interpreting the Damscene Glitter (Arabic: ar-Rawda-l-Bahiyah fi Sharh allam'a-d-Dimashqiya   الروضة البهيّة في شرح اللمعة الدمشقيّة ).

See also 
The Five Martyrs
Shahid Awwal
Shahid Thani
Shahid Salis
Shahid Rabay
Shahid Khamis

References

External links 

Lebanese Shia clerics
1506 births
1558 deaths